Gärtringen is a municipality in the district of Böblingen, Baden-Württemberg, Germany. It is situated 25 km southwest of Stuttgart and consists of the villages Rohrau and Gärtringen.

Notable residents
Friedrich Sieburg (1893–1964), journalist, writer and literary critic, lived in the Villa Schwalbenhof from the 1950s until his death.
Qianhong Gotsch (born 1968), Chinese-German table tennis player

References

Böblingen (district)